Šimonovice is a municipality and village in Liberec District in the Liberec Region of the Czech Republic. It has about 1,400 inhabitants.

Administrative parts
Villages of Minkovice and Rašovka are administrative parts of Šimonovice.

History
The first written mention Šimonovice is from 1545.

References

External links

Villages in Liberec District